Jorge Cuenca Barreno (born 17 November 1999) is a Spanish professional footballer who plays as a centre-back for La Liga club Villarreal.

Club career

Alcorcón
Born in Madrid, Cuenca joined Alcorcón's youth setup in 2015. He made his senior debut with the reserves on 12 February 2017, starting in a 1–0 Tercera División home win against FC Villanueva del Pardillo.

Cuenca played his first professional match on 10 March 2017, starting in a 0–0 away draw against Elche in the Segunda División. At the age of 17 years and 114 days, he became the youngest player to debut for the club.

Barcelona
On 18 July 2017 Cuenca signed a two-year contract with Barcelona's reserve team Barcelona B, still in the second division, for a fee of €400,000. He featured sparingly for the side during his first season, which ended in relegation.

On 20 October 2018, Cuenca scored his first goal for the club, netting a last-minute equalizer for Barça B in a 1–1 home draw against Villareal B in the Segunda División B. Eleven days later he made his first-team debut, starting in a 1–0 away success over Cultural Leonesa in the 2018–19 Copa del Rey.

On 15 February 2019, Cuenca renewed his contract with the Catalans until 2021. On 1 September 2019, Cuenca scored the first official goal at the Johan Cruyff Stadium, receiving a commemorative plate.

Villarreal
On 22 September 2020, Barcelona and Villareal reached an agreement for the transfer of Cuenca, for a fee of €2.5 million plus €4 million in variables; Barça also retained 20% over a future sale. He agreed to a five-year contract with the club, but was immediately loaned to Almería of the second division for a year.

Cuenca scored his first professional goal on 8 November 2020, netting the game's only in an away success over Rayo Vallecano. A regular starter for the Andalusians during the campaign, he scored three times as his side missed out promotion in the play-offs.

On 30 August 2021, Cuenca moved to fellow top-tier side Getafe CF on a one-year loan deal. He made his debut in the category on 13 September in a 1–0 away loss against Elche CF, and scored his first goal on 21 November in a 4–0 home routing of Cádiz CF.

International career
Due to the isolation of some national team players following the positive COVID-19 test of Sergio Busquets, Spain's under-21 squad were called up for the international friendly against Lithuania on 8 June 2021.

Personal life
Cuenca's younger brother, David, plays for Real Madrid's youth setup.

Career statistics

Honours
Barcelona
UEFA Youth League: 2017–18

Individual
UEFA European Under-21 Championship Team of the Tournament: 2021

References

External links
Profile at the Villarreal CF website

1999 births
Living people
Footballers from Madrid
Spanish footballers
Association football defenders
AD Alcorcón B players
AD Alcorcón footballers
FC Barcelona Atlètic players
FC Barcelona players
Villarreal CF players
UD Almería players
Getafe CF footballers
La Liga players
Segunda División players
Segunda División B players
Tercera División players
Spain youth international footballers
Spain under-21 international footballers